Lün is a sum of Töv Province in Mongolia. The Tuul River passes just west of the sum center.

Notable natives and residents
 Danzandarjaagiin Sereeter, a Mongolian wrestler
 Daramyn Tömör-Ochir, a Mongolian politician

External links
 Lun Sum

References

Districts of Töv Province